Abraham ben Daniel of Modena (1511–1578) was an Italian poet and rabbi.

Biography
Abraham ben Daniel was born in the northern Italian city of Modena in the summer of 1511. He went abroad in the winter of 1830, first to Mantua, where he was a tutor with four families for six years. He was afterwards a tutor at Viadana, Modena, Rivarolo, Arezzo, and Forlì, and finally he became rabbi at Ferrara.

From 1536 to 1552, despite persistent medical issues, he composed over a thousand poetical prayers in various metre and forms, mostly in Hebrew but with six in Aramaic. Several of the poems were autobiographical, written for friends, or based on historical events. One of them is in honour of his cousin Hadassah, whom he married in October 1539. A manuscript collection of his prayers in the Bodleian Library (as of 1901) bears the title Sefer ha-Yashar ('The Book of the Righteous').

According to Adolf Neubauer, Abraham ben Daniel "had not the slightest poetical talent."

References
 

1511 births
1578 deaths
16th-century Italian poets
16th-century Italian rabbis
Hebrew-language poets
Religious leaders from Modena
Writers from Modena